Cavenham is a village and civil parish in Suffolk, England,  northwest of Bury St Edmunds. It is in the local government district of West Suffolk, and the electoral ward of Icini.  At the 2001 UK census, Cavenham Parish had a population of 127. In the 1870s it had a population of 229.

The parish includes Cavenham Heath, a Site of Special Scientific Interest (SSSI) with a sand and gravel quarry close to it and is the location of the Black Ditches, an Anglo-Saxon boundary ditch which is believed to be the most easterly of a series of early Anglo-Saxon defensive earthworks built across the Icknield Way. Part of this also forms an SSSI to the south-east of the village.

Notable residents
Thomas Le Blanc (1774-1843), lawyer and academic, Vice-Chancellor of the University of Cambridge from 1824 to 1825.

References

Villages in Suffolk
Forest Heath
Civil parishes in Suffolk